Wilber is a given name. Notable people with the name include:

Wilber M. Brucker (1894–1968), American politician
Wilber Hardee (1918–2008), American fast-food chain founder
Wilber Brotherton Huston (1912–2006), American scientist
Wilber Larrick, American football coach
Wilber Marshall (born 1962), American football player
Wilber Morris (1937–2002),  American jazz double bass player and bandleader
Wilber Otichilo (born 1952), Kenyan politician
Wilber Pan or Will Pan (born 1980), Taiwanese-American singer, actor and VJ
Wilber Pérez (born 1988), Guatemalan footballer
Wilber Rentería born 1992), Colombian footballer 
Wilber Sánchez (footballer) (born 1979), Nicaraguan footballer 
Wilber Sánchez (wrestler) (born 1968), Cuban former wrestler
Wilber G. Smith (1935–1992), American politician
Wilber Moore Stilwell (1908–1974), American artist
Wilber Varela (1957–2008), Colombian police agent and drug trafficker
Wilber Elliott Wilder (1857–1952), U.S. Army Brigadier General

See also
Wilbur (name), given name and surname

English masculine given names